This is an alphabetical list of articles pertaining specifically to chemical engineering.

A

Absorption -- 
Adsorption -- 
Analytical chemistry --

B

Bioaccumulate  -- 
Biochemical engineering --  
Biochemistry  -- 
Biochemistry topics list --
Bioinformatics  -- 
Biology -- 
Bioprocess Engineering --
Biomolecular engineering --
Bioinformatics --
Biomedical engineering --
Bioseparation --
Biotechnology -- 
Bioreactor --  
Biotite  --

C

Catalysis --
Catalytic cracking --
Catalytic reforming --
Catalytic reaction engineering --
Ceramics -- 
Certified Chartered Chemical Engineers --
Chartered Chemical Engineers --
Chemical engineering --
Chemical kinetics -- 
Chemical reaction --
Chemical synthesis --
Chemical vapor deposition (CVD) --
Chemical solution deposition --
Chemistry --
Chromatographic separation --
Circulating fluidized bed --
Combustion --
Computational fluid dynamics (CFD) --
Conservation of energy -- 
Conservation of mass -- 
Conservation of momentum -- 
Crystallization processes --

D
Deal-Grove model --
Dehumidification --
Dehydrogenation --
Depressurization --
Desorption --
Desulfonation --
Desulfurization --
Diffusion --
Distillation --
Drag coefficient --
Drying --

E

Electrochemical engineering --
Electrodialysis --
Electrokinetic phenomena --
Electrodeposition --
Electrolysis --
Electrolytic reduction --
Electroplating --
Electrostatic precipitation --
Electrowinning --
Emulsion --
Energy --
Engineering -- 
Engineering economics --
Enzymatic reaction --

F

Filtration --
Fluid dynamics --
Flow battery --
Fuel cell --
Fuel technology --

G
Gasification --

H

Heat transfer -- 
History of chemical engineering --
Hydrometallurgy --

I

Immobilization --
Inorganic chemistry --
Ion exchange --

J

K
Kinetics (physics) --

L

Laboratory --
Leaching --

M

Mass balance -- 
Mass transfer -- 
Materials science --
Medicinal chemistry --
Microelectronics --
Microfluidics --
Microreaction technology --
Mineral processing --
Mixing --
Momentum transfer --

N

Nanoengineering --
Nanotechnology --

O

Organic chemistry --

P

Periodic table -- 
Pharmacology --
Physical chemistry -- 
Plastic --  
Polymer -- 
Process control -- 
Process design -- 
Process modeling --

Q

Qualitative inorganic analysis -- 
Quantitative analysis --
Quantum chemistry --  
Quartz --

R

Rate equation -- 
Reverse osmosis --

S

Science --
Separation processes --
Solid-state chemistry -- 
Solvent extraction --
Supercritical fluids --

T

Thermodynamics --
Timeline of chemical element discovery --
Transport phenomena

U

Ultrafiltration --
Unit operation --

V
Volatility --

W

Water and waste water treatment --
Waste minimization --

X

Y

Z

Zeolite --  
Zinc --  
Zinnwaldite  -- 
Zircon --  
Zirconium --  
Zone melting --

Chemical engineering